A general election was held in the state of Kansas on November 6, 2018. Primary elections were held on August 7, 2018.

Voters elected all six executive officers, the lower house of the state legislature, and all of the state's delegations to the U.S. House.

U.S. House of Representatives 

Kansas elected four U.S. representatives, one for each congressional districts. In 2018, the delegation's Republican majority changed from 4–0 to 3–1, the first time Democrats have held a seat in the state since 2010.

Governor and Lieutenant Governor 

Incumbent Republicans Jeff Colyer and Tracey Mann lost their party's renomination in a tight primary election won by Secretary of State Kris Kobach and businessman Wink Hartman by a margin of around 0.1 percent. Democrats nominated state senators Laura Kelly and Lynn Rogers, with businessman Greg Orman and state senator John Doll joining the race as independents. Polls leading up to the election had Kobach and Kelly running close, leading to many news outlets predicting a tossup election.

Kelly won the election, beating Kobach by five percentage points. Kelley became the oldest governor in Kansas history, taking office at the age of 68.

Secretary of State 
Incumbent Republican Secretary of State Kris Kobach retired to run for governor, leaving the seat open. State representative Scott Schwab won the Republican primary amidst a number of candidates, while Democratic nominee Brian McClendon ran unopposed after his challengers withdrew. Schwab won the election.

Republican primary

Democratic primary

General election

Attorney General 
Incumbent Republican Attorney General Derek Schmidt ran for re-election to a third term. He successfully defeated Democratic nominee Sarah Swain by 18 points.

Republican primary

Democratic primary

General election

Treasurer 
Incumbent Republican Treasurer Jake LaTurner was appointed to the office on April 25, 2017, following the resignation of his predecessor Ron Estes to join the U.S. House of Representatives. He ran for election to a full term, defeating his Democratic challenger State Senator Marci Francisco by 15.49 points.

Republican primary

Democratic primary

General election

Insurance Commissioner 
Incumbent Republican Insurance Commissioner Ken Selzer retired to run for governor, leaving the seat open. Republican state senators Vicki Schmidt and Clark Shultz competed in a close primary, with Schmidt winning the nomination. The Democratic nominee was president of the Kansas NAACP Nathaniel McLaughlin. Schmidt won the election with the highest vote percentage of any statewide candidate.

Republican primary

Democratic primary

General election

State Board of Education

State House of Representatives 

The Kansas House of Representatives held elections for all 125 seats in 2018. Republicans maintained their supermajority in the chamber, with neither parties making any gains.

References 

 
Kansas